Bickle is an English surname. Notable people with this name include:

 Rich Bickle
 Mike Bickle
 Berry Bickle
 Penny Bickle
 Robert Bickle
 Trevor Bickle
 Travis Bickle
 Michael Bickle
 Thomas A. Bickle
 Lois Moyes Bickle
 Mike Bickle (minister)
 Mike Bickle (footballer)
 Phyllis Bickle
 Purvis Bickle

Other 
 Jesse C. Bickle House
 Bickle Knob

See also 
 Bickley (disambiguation)

English-language surnames